Oskar Piotrowski may refer to:
 Oskar Piotrowski (chess player) (fl. 1902–1935), Polish chess master
 Oskar Piotrowski (gymnast) (born 1996), Polish acrobatic gymnast